Andrew Joron (born March 6, 1955) is an American writer of experimental poetry, speculative fiction, and lyrical and critical essays. He began by writing science fiction poetry. Joron's later poetry, combining scientific and philosophical ideas with the sonic properties of language, has been compared to the work of the Russian Futurist Velimir Khlebnikov. Joron currently lives in the San Francisco Bay Area. In fall 2014, Joron joined the faculty of the Creative Writing Department at San Francisco State University.

He has won the Rhysling Award three times: for Best Long Poem in 1980 and 1986, and for Best Short Poem in 1978; and the Gertrude Stein Award twice, in 1996 and 2006.

Joron's poetry is included in two W. W. Norton anthologies: American Hybrid (2009), edited by Cole Swensen and David St. John, and Postmodern American Poetry (2013), edited by Paul Hoover.

Joron is the translator, from the German, of the Marxist-Utopian philosopher Ernst Bloch’s Literary Essays which was published by Stanford University Press in 1998. Joron is also the translator of The Perpetual Motion Machine by the German fantasist Paul Scheerbart (Wakefield Press, 2011).

During the 1990s, Andrew Joron formed a close friendship with the poet and novelist Gustaf Sobin. Sobin, who died in 2005, designated Joron as his literary co-executor, along with American poet Andrew Zawacki.

Joron also belonged to the circle of Surrealist poet Philip Lamantia in San Francisco from the late '90s until Lamantia's death in 2005. Joron later served as co-editor, with Garrett Caples and Nancy Joyce Peters, of the Collected Poems of Philip Lamantia, published by University of California Press (2013).

Since 2008 he has played theremin in various free-improv and ambient-music ensembles, including Cloud Shepherd and Crow Crash Radio. Joron has written an essay, "The Theremin in My Life," on the relation between his literary and musical activities.

In 2017, Joron performed on theremin in Blood of the Air, Sheldon Brown's composition based on the pitch patterns of poet Philip Lamantia's voice.

In 2019, Joron performed on theremin with Will Alexander on piano and Anne Waldman reading her poetry at the Entanglements conference on science and poetry held at Wake Forest University in North Carolina.

In 2022, Joron returned to the science-fiction genre with the publication of O0 by Black Square Editions.

List of books
Force Fields. Borgo Press, 1987.
Velocities Set (editor). Ocean View Books, 1988.
Science Fiction. Pantograph Press, 1992.
Terminal Velocities (editor). Pantograph Press, 1993.
Invisible Machines with Robert Frazier and Thomas Wiloch. Jazz Police Books, 1997.
The Removes. Hard Press, 1999.
The emergency of poetry. Velocities, 2002.
Fathom. Black Square Editions, 2003.
Neo-surrealism: Or, The Sun At Night. Black Square Editions, 2004.
The Cry at Zero: Selected Prose. Counterpath Press, 2007.
The Sound Mirror. Flood Editions, 2008.
Force Fields with Brian Lucas. Hooke Press, 2010. (This is a different book than Joron's 1987 book of the same title.)
Trance Archive: New and Selected Poems. City Lights Books, 2010. 
The Absolute Letter. Flood Editions, 2017. 
O0. Black Square Editions, 2022.  (a book of speculative fiction consisting of two linked novellas)

References

External links
Andrew Joron's listing in the Encyclopedia of Science Fiction
Andrew Joron's bio at the Poetry Foundation
review of Joron's book The Sound Mirror at Bookforum
review of Joron's book The Absolute Letter at Publishers Weekly
review of Joron's book O0 in Big Other
Peter Greiner's interview with Joron in Big Echo
Joshua Weiner's interview with Joron in Chicago Review

American male poets
American science fiction writers
Living people
American translators
German–English translators
Surrealist poets
Rhysling Award for Best Long Poem winners
Rhysling Award for Best Short Poem winners
American male novelists
1955 births